Heritovo Rakotomanga is a Malagasy Olympic boxer. He represented his country in the featherweight division at the 1992 Summer Olympics. He won his first bout against Wasesa Sabuni, and then lost his second bout to Daniel Dumitrescu.

References

1963 births
Living people
Malagasy male boxers
Olympic boxers of Madagascar
Boxers at the 1992 Summer Olympics
Featherweight boxers